"Holdin' a Good Hand" is a song written by Rob Crosby and Johnny Few, and recorded by American country music artist Lee Greenwood. It was released in June 1990 as the first single and title track from the album Holdin' a Good Hand.  The song reached number 2 on the Billboard Hot Country Singles & Tracks chart.

Chart performance

Year-end charts

References

1990 singles
Lee Greenwood songs
Songs written by Rob Crosby
Capitol Records Nashville singles
Song recordings produced by Jerry Crutchfield
1990 songs